A harpy is a female monster in Greek mythology.

Harpy or harpies may also refer to:

Arts, entertainment, and media
 Harpy (DC Comics mythical), a character in DC Comics introduced in Green Lantern
 Harpy (Denise de Sevigne), a character in DC Comics introduced in Star-Spangled War Stories
 Harpy (Iris Phelios), a character in DC Comics introduced in Batman
 Harpy (Xishuangbanna Theme Park), a steel roller coaster in China
 Harpy, a character in Puyo Puyo
 Marlo Chandler or the Harpy, a character in Marvel Comics
 Betty Ross or the Harpy, a character in Marvel Comics
 Harpy Valentine, a minor character from Saint Seiya
 Harpies (film), a 2007 American television film

Other uses
 Fountain of the Harpies, Madrid
 Harpy eagle, a species of eagle
 IAI Harpy, an unmanned aerial vehicle

See also
 Happy (disambiguation)
 Harp (disambiguation)
 Sharpie (disambiguation)